Erie Art Museum is located in Erie, Pennsylvania. The Museum holds a collection of more than 8,000 objects, with strengths in American ceramics, Tibetan paintings, Indian bronzes, photography, and comic book art. Focusing on the museum collection, the main gallery features Everything but the Shelves; over a thousand objects hung salon-style. In addition to its collection, the museum hosts four to five visiting exhibitions annually.

The Museum has a wide range of offers including lecture series and opportunities to handle some of the best objects in its collection. Educational programs and artists’ services including interdisciplinary and interactive school tours and a wide variety of art classes for the community are also available. The Museum is dedicated to serving more local school children and teachers with the goal of hosting every fourth grade class in Erie County at least once by 2020. The Museum coordinates Gallery Nights throughout the year highlighting the art-scene in Erie. Performing arts are showcased throughout the year during its After Hours and the popular summer program, Mid-Day Art Break, which represents national and international performers.

Museum complex

In 2010 the Museum opened a new building that tied together five historic buildings into a single  complex, providing a new, visitor-friendly entrance, tripling the public space and providing new galleries, classrooms, and visitor amenities, such as a gift shop and café. This $9 million expansion project created a new  building that has been certified for Leadership in Energy and Environmental Design at the Gold level—the first LEED-certified building in the City of Erie. In 2011 the federal Institute of Museum and Library Services awarded the Erie Art Museum the nation's highest honor for museums, the National Medal for Museum and Library Service. The complex includes:

 The Old Custom House, a Greek Revival building constructed in 1837-39 of Vermont marble
 The Cashiers House, a Greek Revival townhouse also completed in 1839
 The Bonnell Block, a Greek Revival commercial building built in 1840 that houses the Erie Art Museum's Holstein Gallery
 The expansion added in 2010.

History

The Erie Art Museum was founded in 1898 as The Art Club of Erie, by a group of Erie artists led by Mrs. Lovisa Card-Catlin. The Art Club managed the Art Gallery located in the Public Library on Perry Square. In the 1940s, when the Art Club relocated, along with the Erie Public Museum (which had occupied the basement of the Library) to the Watson-Curtze Mansion at 356 West Sixth Street. In 1956, the Art Club acquired the Wood-Morrison House, at 338 West Sixth Street, which, along with its carriage house, became known as the Art Center of Erie. Following a successful membership drive, and the launch of the United Arts Fund Drive, the organization hired John L. Vanco, as its director and first professional employee, in 1968.

As the Erie Art Center, the organization expanded to include year-round exhibitions and education programs (1969), instituted an active program of collecting and a traveling exhibition program (1973), and added a darkroom (1973), frame shop (1975), and artist studios (1977).

Having outgrown the Sixth Street buildings, the organization created the ClaySpace ceramics studio (1981), a theater (1982) and artist studio rental spaces (1983) in the ArtWorks building at 1505 State Street. At the same time, the organization changed its name to Erie Art Museum and purchased the former Ashby Printing Company buildings at 423 State Street and 10 East 5th Street, which became known collectively as the Erie Art Museum Annex. The storefront at 423 State was developed to house the Frame Shop, including a small gallery facing the street. Later, the eastern portion of the first floor became a performance venue, and a classroom and gallery (2003) were added on the second floor.

While Clayspace still resides at the 1505 State Street building now owned by the Performing Arts Collective Alliance, Clayspace is now an independent cooperative, which is separate from the Erie Art Museum.

References

External links
Erie Art Museum website
Everything but the Shelves Virtual Tour

Art museums and galleries in Pennsylvania
Museums in Erie, Pennsylvania